Excelsior Township may refer to the following townships in the United States:

 Excelsior Township, Dickinson County, Iowa
 Excelsior Township, Michigan, in Kalkaska County